The United States Physics Olympiad (USAPhO) is a high school physics competition run by the American Association of Physics Teachers and the American Institute of Physics to select the team to represent the United States at the International Physics Olympiad (IPhO). The team is selected through a series of exams testing their problem solving abilities. The top 20 finalists are invited to a rigorous study camp at the University of Maryland to prepare for the IPhO.

History
The International Physics Olympiad began in 1967 among Eastern European countries; many western countries soon joined in the 1970s. In 1986, the American Association of Physics Teachers led by Jack Wilson organized the United States Physics Team for the first time. The 1986 team was made up of 20 talented high school physics students nominated by their teachers. Five students were selected for the International Physics Olympiad after a rigorous preparation at the University of Maryland. At the 1986 London IPhO, the team brought home three bronze medals.

Since then, the US Physics Team has regularly placed in the top ten nations at the international competition. It has accumulated 66 Gold Medals, 48 Silver Medals, 29 Bronze Medals, and 11 Honorable Mentions at IPhO as of 2019.

Academic directors
 Tengiz Bibilashvili (2021–present)
 JiaJia Dong (2018–2021)
 Paul Stanley (2008–2018)
 Robert Shurtz (2006–2008)
 Mary Mogge (1998–2006)
 Ed Neuenschwander (1996–1998)
 Larry D. Kirkpatrick (1988–1996)

Alumni
 Sherry Gong (2006)
 Natalia Toro (1999)
 Chris Hirata (1996)
 Rhiju Das (1995)
 Steven Gubser (1989)

Physics team selection

The procedure to select the U.S. Physics Team consists of two exams: the "F=ma" and the "USA Physics Olympiad" (USAPhO). Approximately the top 20 finishers are invited to the U.S. Physics Team training camp. (In some previous years, there was also an intermediate, quarterfinal exam.)

F = ma exam
Approximately 6,000 students take this first exam, which consists of 25 multiple choice questions to be solved in 75 minutes, focusing on algebra-based mechanics. In the past, a quarter point was deducted for each incorrect answer. From 2015 onwards, no points were deducted for incorrect answers. Prior to 2018, the exam was offered over multiple weeks at the discretion of the exam centers. From 2018 to 2023, the exam was changed to two single-day events with two different exams, F=ma A and F=ma B, to increase exam security. As of 2023, only one F=ma exam is given.

USAPhO exam
Approximately the top 400 students from the F=ma exam are invited to take a free-response, calculus-based exam covering all topics in introductory physics, including mechanics, electricity and magnetism, thermodynamics, fluids, relativity, waves, and nuclear and atomic physics. There are two parts in the exam, each allotted 90 minutes, and 6 problems in total. Prior to 2017, the exam could be taken at any time during a two-week window in March. Afterward, the exam was changed to be a single day event in early April, to protect exam security.

All USAPhO qualifiers receive certificates of recognition for their physics skill. The medal system is modeled on that of the International Physics Olympiad: approximately the top 10-12% scorers in the USAPhO will receive gold medals, the next 14-16% receive silver medals, the next 19-21% receive bronze medals and the next 24-26% receive honorable mentions.

Training camp
Approximately the top 20 students in the nation are selected for the U.S. Physics Team, and invited to a training camp at the University of Maryland. There, students receive intensive theoretical and experimental preparation and take a series of selection tests. The top five students travel to the International Physics Olympiad to represent the United States.

References

External links
U.S. Physics Team Home Page
Past Tests and Solutions

Youth science
Student quiz competitions
Physics competitions
Science events in the United States
Education competitions in the United States